Arraiza is a surname of Navarran Basque origin. Notable people with the surname include:

Eunate Arraiza (born 1991), Spanish women's footballer
Jorge Arraiza (born 1970), Puerto Rican musician
Pedro Arraiza (born 1973), Puerto Rican musician

References

Basque-language surnames